The Citadel Bulldogs basketball teams represented The Citadel, The Military College of South Carolina in Charleston, South Carolina, United States.  The program was established in 1900–01, and has continuously fielded a team since 1912–13.  Their primary rivals are College of Charleston, Furman and VMI.

1989–90

The 1989–90 season was the first at the newly renovated McAlister Field House.

|-
|colspan=7 align=center|1990 Southern Conference men's basketball tournament

1990–91

|-
| colspan=7 align=center|1991 Southern Conference men's basketball tournament

1991–92

|-
| colspan=7 align=center|1992 Southern Conference men's basketball tournament

1992–93

|-
| colspan=7 align=center|1993 Southern Conference men's basketball tournament

1993–94

|-
| colspan=7 align=center|1994 Southern Conference men's basketball tournament

References
 

The Citadel Bulldogs basketball seasons